Christine Jackson (1942 – 11 October 2013), was the Chairperson of the Civil Liberties Trust and a lifetime campaigner for human rights. She chaired an NHS Health Trust, was on the Board of Sheffield Theatres and was a member of the Bar Council's Disciplinary Committee. In later life she conducted humanist funerals. She died of cancer.

References

1942 births
2013 deaths
British human rights activists
Women human rights activists
Deaths from cancer
British humanists
National Council for Civil Liberties people